This was the first edition of the event.

Henri Leconte won the title, beating Andrei Medvedev 6–2, 6–3 in the final.

Seeds

Draw

Finals

Top half

Bottom half

External links
 Main draw

1993 Gerry Weber Open